Simon Richard Betts (born 3 March 1973) is an English footballer who played as a midfielder in the Football League.

Career
Betts began his career at Ipswich Town, although he made no first team league appearances. His most successful spell was with his second club, Colchester United, where he made 191 league appearances and scored 11 goals. He then had a spell with Scarborough, before moving to Yeovil Town. Betts' contract was terminated by mutual consent after 17 appearances in 2001. He made appearances for Darlington and non-league teams including Whitby Town, Halstead Town and Needham Market.

Honours

Club
Colchester United
 Football League Third Division Playoff Winner (1): 1997–98

References

External links
 
 
 Simon Betts at Colchester United Archive Database

1973 births
Living people
English footballers
Footballers from Middlesbrough
Association football midfielders
Ipswich Town F.C. players
Colchester United F.C. players
Scarborough F.C. players
Yeovil Town F.C. players
Darlington F.C. players
Whitby Town F.C. players
Halstead Town F.C. players
Needham Market F.C. players
English Football League players